Faur București was a football club based in Bucharest, Romania.

History
The club was established in 1935 as Metalul by workers at Malaxa. Prior to World War II they were known as Titanii and Rogifer. After the nationalisation of Malaxa, the club was renamed 23 August before becoming Metalochimic. In 1947–48 the club won promotion from Divizia B into Divizia A. However, they finished second bottom of the division the following season, and were relegated back to Divizia B. The club was later renamed Energia and then back to Metalul again. The club's junior team won the national championship in 1970 and 1980.

Following the Romanian Revolution in 1989, the club became Faur București. It folded in 2005.

Chronology of names

Honours

Liga II:
Winners (1): 1947–48
Runners-up (4): 1950, 1958–59, 1972–73, 1978–79

See also
:Category:Faur București players

References

External links
 romaniansoccer.ro

Defunct football clubs in Romania
Football clubs in Bucharest
Association football clubs established in 1935
1935 establishments in Romania
Association football clubs disestablished in 2005
2005 disestablishments in Romania